Marie-Françoise Audollent (22 May 1943 – 30 March 2008) was a French actress. She was known for her role in The Da Vinci Code. Her other roles have included Éloge de l'amour and Le Comte de Monte Cristo.

Filmography

References

External links
 

1943 births
2008 deaths
Accidental deaths from falls
French film actresses
French television actresses
Accidental deaths in France
Place of birth missing
Actors from Clermont-Ferrand
20th-century French actresses
21st-century French actresses